Samangan (also Romanized as Samangān; also known as Samangām) is a village in Dughayi Rural District, in the Central District of Quchan County, Razavi Khorasan Province, Iran. At the 2006 census, its population was 19, in 5 families.

References 

Populated places in Quchan County